The Dobova–Ljubljana Railway is a  long, double-tracked railway line in Slovenia, which is operated by Slovenske železnice Infrastruktura d.o.o. It is electrified with 3 kV DC from Ljubljana to Dobova and 25 kV AC from Dobova to the national border, where it connects to Croatian railway network, specifically the M101 line extending to Zagreb.

The railway line follows the Sava Valley and is integral part of Pan-European Corridor X, running from Salzburg through Ljubljana and Zagreb towards Skopje and Thessaloniki. It was the route of the Orient Express service from 1919 to 1977.

See also
Pan-European Corridor X

References

External links

International railway lines
Railway lines in Slovenia